William Fraser Russell (born 6 December 1901 in Falkirk) was a Scottish professional footballer who played as an inside right. He scored both goals for Airdrieonians in the 1924 Scottish Cup Final.

Playing career

Airdrieonians
He formed part of a potent Airdrie front line including Hughie Gallacher and Bob McPhail. Russell scored both goals for the Diamonds when they won the 1924 Scottish Cup Final against Hibernian. McPhail said, "The terror-like attitude of Gallacher caused havoc with the Hibs defenders. He and Russell were easily our best forwards". They also finished second that season in Scotland's top division, both outcomes marking the pinnacle of the club's achievements.

After five full seasons in Airdrie, he moved to Preston North End in England, where he spent around the same length of time, then had a short spell with Irish club Shelbourne in the autumn of his career.

International
Russell represented Scotland twice, debuting in the season of the cup win on 16 February 1924 in a 2–0 defeat to Wales in Cardiff. His second and final full cap was on 4 April 1925 in a 2–0 win against England at Hampden Park; Airdrie teammate Gallacher scored both goals. He also represented the Scottish League twice in the season after the cup win. He played in a 3–0 win against the Irish League at Tynecastle Park and scored twice in a 4–3 defeat to England at Goodison Park (Gallacher was the other Scottish scorer).

References

Sources

1901 births
Year of death missing
Scottish footballers
Association football inside forwards
Scottish Junior Football Association players
Airdrieonians F.C. (1878) players
Preston North End F.C. players
Benburb F.C. players
Shelbourne F.C. players
Scottish Football League players
English Football League players
Expatriate association footballers in the Republic of Ireland
League of Ireland players
Scottish expatriate sportspeople in Ireland
Scottish Football League representative players
Scotland international footballers
Footballers from Falkirk